Manuel Robles may refer to:

 Manuel Robles Pezuela (1817–1862), President of Mexico
 Manuel Robles (table tennis) (born 1959), table tennis player from Spain